As God Made Her is a 1920 Dutch silent film directed by Maurits Binger.

Cast
 Mary Odette - Rachel Higgins
 Henry Victor - Seward Pendyne
 Adelqui Migliar - Sir Richard Pendyne
 Lola Cornero - Lady Muriel Pendyne
 Norman Doxat-Pratt - Zoontje van Rachel en Seward
 Marie Spiljar - Guineveve Champernel
 Reginald Lawson
 Leni Marcus

External links 
 

Dutch silent feature films
1920 films
Dutch black-and-white films
Films directed by Maurits Binger